Desert Fury is a 1947 American film noir crime film directed by Lewis Allen, and starring John Hodiak, Lizabeth Scott and Burt Lancaster.

The story was adapted for the screen by Robert Rossen and A. I. Bezzerides (uncredited), based on the racy novel Desert Town by Ramona Stewart. The picture was produced by Hal Wallis, with music by Miklós Rózsa and cinematography in Technicolor by Edward Cronjager and Charles Lang.

Plot
Fritzi Haller (Mary Astor) is the powerful owner of Purple Sage, a saloon and casino in the small fictional mining town of Chuckawalla, Nevada. Her daughter, Paula Haller (Lizabeth Scott), has just quit school and returned home at the same time that gangster Eddie Bendix (John Hodiak) has returned. He was once involved with Fritzi, but left town under suspicion of murdering his wife.

Paula does not have a good relationship with her mother Fritzi and when she sees how unpleasant Eddie is for her, she begins a relationship with the crook. Paula's old boyfriend, and local lawman, Tom Hanson (Burt Lancaster), along with Bendix's sidekick, Johnny Ryan (Wendell Corey), try to break up the relationship. When Fritzi finds out, she angrily tries to protect Paula and put a stop to her seeing Bendix. But the resolute Paula does not give up easily until she knows the past of her beloved Eddie.

Bendix's past catches up with him in an unexpected way when the car he is in, running from Hanson (who wants to rid the town of the likes of Bendix and Ryan), crashes through the railing as it is going onto the bridge and plunges down the embankment, killing him.

Cast
 John Hodiak as Eddie Bendix
 Lizabeth Scott as Paula Haller
 Burt Lancaster as Tom Hanson 
 Wendell Corey as Johnny Ryan
 Mary Astor as Fritzi Haller
 Kristine Miller as Claire Lindquist
 William Harrigan as Judge Berle Lindquist
 James Flavin as Sheriff Pat Johnson
 Jane Novak as Mrs. Lindquist
 Anna Camargo as Rosa

Production
Scenes were shot on location in the small Ventura County, California, town of Piru, with the northwest side of Center Street, at Main, used as the exterior of Fritzi's saloon and casino; the Piru Mansion was used as the Haller home and the historic Piru bridge was used as the locale of the car crash. Some scenes were also shot in Clarkdale, Arizona.

Some outside shots were filmed in the Old Town section of Cottonwood, Arizona.

Release
The film had its world premiere in Salt Lake City on Wednesday, July 23, 1947 with principal stars Burt Lancaster and Lizabeth Scott in attendance.

The movie was released by Kino Lorber on Blu-ray and DVD in the U.S. on Feb. 26, 2019.

Reception

Critical response
When the film was released, The New York Times roundly despised it. They wrote, "Desert Fury is a beaut - a beaut of a Technicolored mistake from beginning to end. If this costly Western in modern dress had been made by a lesser producer than Hal Wallis it could be dismissed in a sentence. But Mr. Wallis is a man with a considerable reputation, being a two-time winner of the Irving Thalberg Award of the Academy of Motion Picture Arts and Sciences, and Desert Fury is such an incredibly bad picture in all respects save one, and that is photographically."

In later years the film has been praised as a seminal and unique Hollywood melodrama due to its bold overtones of homosexuality:

Film scholar Foster Hirsch wrote, "In a truly subversive move the film jettisons the characters' criminal activities to concentrate on two homosexual couples: the mannish mother who treats her daughter like a lover, and the gangster and his devoted possessive sidekick. (...) Desert Fury is shot in the lurid, over-saturated colors that would come to define the 1950s melodramas of Douglas Sirk."

Film noir expert Eddie Muller wrote, "Desert Fury is the gayest movie ever produced in Hollywood's golden era. The film is saturated - with incredibly lush color, fast and furious dialogue dripping with innuendo, double entendres, dark secrets, outraged face-slappings, overwrought Miklos Rosza violins. How has this film escaped revival or cult status? It's Hollywood at its most gloriously berserk."

In one notable piece of dialogue for the period, Paula asks Eddie how he and Johnny met. He replies: "It was in the automat off Times Square, about two o'clock in the morning on a Saturday. I was broke, he had a couple of dollars, we got to talking. He ended up paying for my ham and eggs.""And then?", Paula asks. To which the reply is: "I went home with him that night. We were together from then on."

On review aggregator website Rotten Tomatoes, the film holds an approval rating of 57% based on 7 critics, with an average rating of 5.5/10.

Re-release
Paramount reissued the film in February 1959.

Preservation
The Academy Film Archive preserved a screen test for Desert Fury, with Burt Lancaster and Lizabeth Scott, in 2012.

See also
 List of American films of 1947

References

External links
 
 
 
 
 
 
 Desert Fury information site and DVD review clip at DVD Beaver (includes images)
 

1947 films
1947 romantic drama films
American romantic drama films
Color film noir
1940s English-language films
Films based on American novels
Films directed by Lewis Allen
Films set in mining communities
Films set in Nevada
Paramount Pictures films
Films scored by Miklós Rózsa
Films produced by Hal B. Wallis
Films with screenplays by Robert Rossen
1940s American films